Lesterps (L'Esterp in Limousin, an Occitan dialect) is a commune in the Charente department in southwestern France.

The inhabitants are called Lesterrois and Lesterroises.

Geography

Lesterps is located in Charente Limousin, in the north-east of the Charente department and borders Haute-Vienne.
The village of Lesterps, 9 km east of Confolens, is a major market town. It is 16 km from Chabanais, 17 km from Saint-Junien, 42 km from Limoges and 63 km from Angoulême.

The town is well served by roads. The D30, from Confolens to Limoges via Saint-Junien, crosses it from west to east, and the D29, from Saulgond to Brillac, crosses it from south to north. The D82 east of the village goes to Limoges via Saint-Christophe.
The nearest train station is  Chabanais, served by TER to Angoulême and Limoges.

Population

See also
Communes of the Charente department

References

Communes of Charente